Caroline Shotton is a British commercial artist who frequently incorporates cows into her artwork.  
Caroline gained recognition for her 2007 Great Moosters series, re-imagining famous paintings using the cow motif.

Background and education 
Shotton grew up on the outskirts of London, benefiting from being within easy reach of not only renowned art galleries but also the open countryside, both of which are a source of inspiration to her.  
While studying at Central Saint Martins, Shotton was captivated by surrealist and impressionist art, and much of her work now combines influences of both.

Studies at Central Saint Martins then progressed to a self-made career as a freelance artist, working in the commercial sector. Shotton undertook commissions from businesses throughout Britain, from large abstracts to intricate murals, and began her gallery career.

Great Moo-sters series
In 2007, Shotton produced a series of paintings replicating classical works of art as cows. She would go on to title the series The Great Moosters.
The inspiration for the series, she says, came to her while watching a documentary about Mona Lisa.
"I wanted to paint something happy for my child's bedroom wall" explains Caroline. "I wanted to create a character that would make him smile and keep him company."
Having settled upon the cow motif, she then formulated puns befitting her chosen subjects; whereby Mona Lisa became Moo-na Lisa.
Other reinterpreted masterpieces include Cow with the Pearl Earring, after Vermeer's Girl with the Pearl Earring, and Persistence of Moomery after Salvador Dalí's Persistence of Memory.

Her popularity grew after publishing The Great Moosters as a collection of limited-edition prints.

Washington Green art publishing
Painting and travelling as a working freelancer was too much of a challenge as a new mother, so Shotton began approaching publishing companies. 
The artist finally signed a contract with Washington Green Fine Art Publishers.

Washington Green were quick to appreciate Shotton's "unique and appealing style," and out of her many painting techniques the publisher focussed on the artist's cow motif.
Since then, Shotton and Washington Green have forged a long-standing and successful partnership. Caroline is now represented by Washington Green Fine Art, and remains one of the biggest selling artists within their portfolio.

Special projects 
In July 2008, Shotton created two boxed canvasses in aid of Bliss, the charity for "Special Care Babies", as she was inspired by her own personal experience with the charity. 
The pieces, called Handle With Care and Special Delivery, were reproduced as timed limited edition boxed canvasses and both depict the nature of how fragile premature babies are and how much care they need.

References

External links 
  Official Source
 
 Caroline Shotton Artwork & Painting Sellers
 Official website of Caroline Shotton

Living people
1973 births
20th-century English painters
21st-century English painters
20th-century English women artists
21st-century English women artists
British contemporary painters
English women painters
Naïve painters
Painters from London